Partridge Cottage is a historic apartment house and cure cottage located at Saranac Lake, town of North Elba in Essex County, New York.  It was built in 1925 and is a three-story, dwelling surmounted by a metal roof with gables on all four sides.  The south gable takes the form of a steeply pitched gambrel.  It displays elements of the Colonial Revival style.  It features a verandah that extends to a porte cochere and once had three apartments, one on each floor each with an eight feet by ten feet cure porch.  Also on the property is a contributing garage.  A basement apartment is believed to have been occupied by the owner.

It was listed on the National Register of Historic Places in 1992.

References

Houses on the National Register of Historic Places in New York (state)
Colonial Revival architecture in New York (state)
Houses completed in 1925
Houses in Essex County, New York
National Register of Historic Places in Essex County, New York